Rasmus Nielsen (born 14 July 1987) is a retired Danish footballer.

He previously played in the Danish Superliga for Lyngby BK.

References

 AB henter HB Køge-anfører hjem‚ bold.dk, 31 May 2016

External links
 
 ab-fodbold.dk
 hbkoge.dk
 superstats.dk

Danish men's footballers
Danish Superliga players
Lyngby Boldklub players
HB Køge players
1987 births
Living people
Footballers from Copenhagen
Association football midfielders